Madian is a town under the administration of Anping County, Hebei, China. , it has 31 villages under its administration.

References 

Township-level divisions of Hebei
Anping County